The 2014 Fort Lauderdale Strikers season was the team's ninth season overall, and fourth in the North American Soccer League (NASL).

The season followed the Spring / Fall format adopted by the NASL in 2013 with the Spring season starting on April 12 and lasting for 9 games until June 8, while the Fall season began the night before the 2014 World Cup Final on July 12 and lasted November 1, for 18 games total. The winner of the Spring championship again hosted the 2014 Soccer Bowl.

Club

Competitions

Pre-season and Exhibitions

Pre-season

Exhibitions

NASL Spring Season 

The Spring season will last for 9 games beginning on April 12 and ending on June 8.  The schedule will feature a single round robin format with each team playing every other team in the league a single time.  Half the teams will host 5 home games and play 4 road games whereas the other half of the teams will play 4 home games and 5 road games.

Standings

Results

Results by round

Match reports

NASL Fall Season 

The Fall season will last for 18 games beginning on July 12 and ending on November 1.  The schedule will feature a double round robin format with each team playing every other team in the league twice, one at home and one on the road.  The winner of the Fall season will play the winner of the Spring season in the Soccer Bowl 2014 Championship game except if the Spring and Fall Champions are the same team in which case the team with the best overall Spring and Fall record behind that team will be their opponent.

Standings

Results

Results by round

Match reports

U.S. Open Cup 

The Strikers exited the 2014 Open Cup in the Third Round after an upset loss to the Premier Development League's Laredo Heat.

Stats

Top scorers
Includes all competitive matches. The list is sorted by shirt number when total goals are equal.

{| class="wikitable" style="font-size: 95%; text-align: center;"
|-
!width=15|
!width=15|
!width=15|
!width=15|
!width=150|Name
!width=130|NASL
!width=120|U.S. Open Cup
!width=80|Total
|-
||1
|11
|FW
|
|Fafà Picault
|12
|0
|12
|-
||2
|20
|MF
|
|Mark Anderson
|6
|0
|6
|-
||3
|9
|MF
|
|Martin Nuñez
|5
|0
|5
|-
|rowspan=2|4
|15
|FW
|
|Aly Hassan
|3
|0
|3
|-
|17
|MF
|
|Shawn Chin
|3
|0
|3
|-
|rowspan=2|5
|8
|MF
|
|Pecka
|2
|0
|2
|-
|21
|MF
|
|Darnell King
|2
|0
|2
|-
|rowspan=7|6
|6
|MF
|
|Chris Nurse
|1
|0
|1
|-
|7
|MF
|
|Gonzalo De Mujica
|0
|1
|1
|-
|14
|MF
|
|Carlos Salazar
|1
|0
|1
|-
|19
|FW
|
|Jenison Brito
|1
|0
|1
|-
|19
|FW
|
|Marius Ebbers
|1
|0
|1
|-
|29
|FW
|
|Yaikel Pérez
|0
|1
|1
|-
|33
|DF
|
|Rafael Alves
|1
|0
|1
|-
|colspan="4"|
|TOTALS
|38
|2
|40

Top Assists
Includes all competitive matches. The list is sorted by shirt number when total assists are equal.

{| class="wikitable" style="font-size: 95%; text-align: center;"
|-
!width=15|
!width=15|
!width=15|
!width=15|
!width=150|Name
!width=130|NASL
!width=120|U.S. Open Cup
!width=80|Total
|-
||1
|17
|MF
|
|Shawn Chin
|5
|0
|5
|-
||2
|21
|MF
|
|Darnell King
|4
|0
|4
|-
|rowspan=2|3
|12
|DF
|
|Iván Guerrero
|3
|0
|3
|-
|14
|MF
|
|Carlos Salazar
|1
|2
|3
|-
|rowspan=4|5
|9
|MF
|
|Martin Nuñez
|2
|0
|2
|-
|11
|FW
|
|Fafà Picault
|2
|0
|2
|-
|19
|FW
|
|Marius Ebbers
|2
|0
|2
|-
|20
|MF
|
|Mark Anderson
|2
|0
|2
|-
|rowspan=2|6
|14
|MF
|
|James Marcelin
|1
|0
|1
|-
|73
|MF
|
|Walter Ramirez
|1
|0
|1
|-
|colspan="4"|
|TOTALS
|23
|2
|25

References 

Fort Lauderdale Strikers seasons
Fort Lauderdale Strikers
Fort Lauderdale Strikers